São Raimundo das Mangabeiras is a municipality in the state of Maranhão in the Northeast region of Brazil.

History 

The beginning of the settlement of São Raimundo das Mangabeiras dates from 1890, but until 1895 only lived Faustino Trindade and Sabino Bezerra, who were, as it is known, their first inhabitants. Then, coming from Jurumenha - PI, Cipriano Taveira arrived with the help of the local population and neighboring villages in the construction of a church dedicated to Saint Raimundo Nonato, still patron of the city. In 1917, Colonel Manoel José de Santana of New York and Major Rozendo Pires Ferreira of Loreto founded the Santana & Pires firm in São Raimundo das Mangabeiras, which is dedicated to the purchase of agricultural products and the sale of manufactured goods, Becoming very well known in the south of Maranhão and north of Goiás.

In 1925 he was elevated to the rank of town and, as a result of efforts made by State Representative José Franklin da Serra Costa, gained political autonomy by virtue of Law No. 272, dated December 31, 1948. His first (named) mayor was Colonel Raimundo Nonato dos Santos, being then elected Manoel Olívio de Carvalho.

Education 

The main schools are: Integrated Unit Mr. João Bosco (municipal) Teaching Center São Raimundo Nonato (state), Escola Moranguinho (private), Escola Infantil Raio de Sol (private) Integrated Unit Monsenhor Barros (state), INFO Professional Qualification, Unit Integrated Father Fábio Bertagnolli (Municipal) and Integrated Unit Mr. Rino Carlesi (Municipal), Integrated Unit Manoel da Silva Costa (Municipal).

Library 
The city has a municipal public library: the Maria Salomé da Silva Moura Library.

IFMA 
The agricultural school, which preceded the Institute, was requested by the federal deputy Cléber Verde, of the PRB, in 2007. With the approval of the law that transformed the agrotechniques in the Federal Institutes, the municipality was contemplated with a campus. The IFMA - Federal Institute of Science and Technology of Maranhão - was instituted in the Campus of São Raimundo das Mangabeiras through the current President of TCU, Minister Raimundo Carreiro, who was honored by the institution that gave his name to the library Of the Institute. The IFMA was a regional lever in the parameters of education in the secondary, technical and superior education until then lacking in the city. With this, the flow of immigrant students increased so much that in 2016, approximately 50% of the students were from surrounding cities.

Politic

See also
List of municipalities in Maranhão

References

Municipalities in Maranhão